The Asia/Oceania Zone was one of the three zones of the regional Davis Cup competition in 1990.

In the Asia/Oceania Zone there were two different tiers, called groups, in which teams competed against each other to advance to the upper tier.

Group I
Winners in Group I advanced to the World Group Qualifying Round, along with losing teams from the World Group first round. The winner of the preliminary round joined the remaining teams in the main draw first round, while the losing team was relegated to the Asia/Oceania Zone Group II in 1991.

Participating nations

Draw

  relegated to Group II in 1991.

  and  advance to World Group Qualifying Round.

Preliminary round

China vs. Pakistan

First round

China vs. Philippines

India vs. Japan

Second round

China vs. Indonesia

South Korea vs. India

Group II
The winner in Group II advanced to the Asia/Oceania Zone Group I in 1991.

Participating nations

Draw

  promoted to Group I in 1991.

First round

Jordan vs. Malaysia

Singapore vs. Chinese Taipei

Bahrain vs. Iraq

Kuwait vs. Syria

Second round

Malaysia vs. Hong Kong

Bangladesh vs. Chinese Taipei

Sri Lanka vs. Bahrain

Kuwait vs. Thailand

Third round

Hong Kong vs. Chinese Taipei

Sri Lanka vs. Thailand

Fourth round

Thailand vs. Hong Kong

References

External links
Davis Cup official website

Davis Cup Asia/Oceania Zone
Asia Oceania Zone